The  is one of a number of traditional Buddhist pilgrimage routes in Japan. The route includes 33 sites sacred to the boddhisattva Kannon, across the Chūgoku region (Okayama, Hiroshima, Yamaguchi, Shimane and Tottori prefectures). The 33 Kannon were selected in 1981.

List of Temples with Kannon

See also

 Japan 100 Kannon, pilgrimage composed of the Saigoku, Bandō and Chichibu pilgrimages.
 Saigoku 33 Kannon, pilgrimage in the Kansai region. 
 Bandō 33 Kannon, pilgrimage in the Kantō region.
 Chichibu 34 Kannon, pilgrimage in Saitama Prefecture.
 Shikoku Pilgrimage, 88 Temple pilgrimage in the Shikoku island. 
 Musashino Kannon Pilgrimage, pilgrimage in Tokyo and Saitama prefectures.
 Kannon
 Buddhism in Japan
 Tourism in Japan
 For an explanation of terms concerning Japanese Buddhism, Japanese Buddhist art, and Japanese Buddhist temple architecture, see the Glossary of Japanese Buddhism.

External links
 Official Website
 Map of the 33 + 4 temples at "Mum, I'm Here!"

Buddhist pilgrimage sites in Japan
Buddhist temples in Okayama Prefecture
Buddhist temples in Hiroshima Prefecture
Buddhist temples in Yamaguchi Prefecture
Buddhist temples in Tottori Prefecture
Buddhist temples in Shimane Prefecture